The Darden Progressive Incubator is a program designed to support promising early-stage business ventures involving Darden MBA students. The Incubator is located on the campus of the Darden Graduate School of Business Administration in Charlottesville, Virginia.

Participation
The Darden Incubator is open to anyone within the University of Virginia community with an entrepreneurial business idea; entry is via business concept and business plan competitions held annually at Darden. Once in the Incubator, each business is led by Darden students—whether as principals or as development managers—through a series of increasingly demanding criteria (called "gates") to the point of start-up or abandonment. Each gate is made operational with the help of an outside panel of experts in new venture development.

References

University of Virginia
Business incubators of the United States